Plasma Sword: Nightmare of Bilstein, released in Japan as , is a 1998 3D weapon-based fighting video game released by Capcom for the arcades. It is the sequel to Star Gladiator and runs on the ZN-2 hardware, an improved version of the PlayStation-based ZN-1 hardware its predecessor ran on. A Dreamcast port was released in 2000.

Gameplay
The control system from the first Star Gladiator was reworked and rebuilt for the sequel. Much like the first game, players are given an arsenal of four usable buttons. Two of the buttons are attacks for a fighter's weapon while one button is used for a kick attack and the final button is used for inward and outward sidesteps as well as dashes. The Plasma Combo System was discarded in favor of the Plasma Strike System, in which all characters have a Plasma Gauge (similar to the ones found in Street Fighter and Darkstalkers) and that they can store up to three levels of the Plasma Gauge, enabling them to pull off super moves called Plasma Strikes. Unlike the first game, fighters are able to battle on an endless 3D plane field, meaning that ring-outs were unavailable from within sight. Like other 3D fighting games, set combos were implemented through tapping a specific sequence of buttons. However, characters could perform special moves from within the combos themselves, akin to 2D fighting games (similar to the treatment found in the Street Fighter EX series). Characters can also counter incoming attacks using a Plasma Reflect or Plasma Revenge tactic against their opponent, requiring at least half of a Plasma Gauge level.

One new tactic introduced from within Plasma Sword is that characters were granted a unique special skill called a Plasma Field. With the use of one level from the Plasma Gauge, the character who activates it will emit a sphere of Plasma energy around them. If the opposing character is hit by it, the 3D plane field will be temporarily boxed in with four invisible walls, making escape from the Plasma Field quite difficult. The effects of the Plasma Field vary with each character, ranging from infinite Plasma Strikes, growing to gigantic sizes, and even stopping time.

With the exception of Rimgal and Kappah, the remaining characters of the original Star Gladiator return for the sequel. The ten returning characters are joined by fourteen new characters, of which ten are considered "mirror images" of the returning ones, while the remaining two new characters have their own unique fighting styles. The ten "mirror image" characters share the same weaponry, attacks, and Plasma Fields of the original cast, but each "mirror image" character has their own unique Plasma Strikes, character designs, and original stories. There are two sub-bosses/secret characters from within the game and both of them can only be played through the use of their own codes.

The Arcade Mode of Plasma Sword has the player going through eight stages of combat. Upon reaching the fifth stage, the player's character will encounter a mid-boss that further advances the story of the playing character. Once the player reaches the eighth and final stage, they will battle against a specific final boss for their playing character. Depending on the number of Battle Ability points that the player acquires from within the duration of Arcade Mode, the playing character will have a unique ending. If the player is unable to gain the required amount of Battle Ability points needed in order to continue on, the playing character will have an abridged (false) ending. Should the player succeed in gaining the required number of Battle Ability points, they will have the chance and opportunity to face off against another CPU-controlled character, who is considered to be the "true" final boss for the playing character and once they are defeated, the player will then be presented with an extended conclusion of the playing character's story that is considered to be the "true" ending.

Story
In the epic battle of the Final Crusade that had occurred from within last year, Hayato Kanzaki had slayed the evil Dr. Edward Bilstein and brought the end of the Fourth Empire's terror and destruction throughout the entire universe. The fall of the Fourth Empire and the death of its leader were momentous occasions of last year and that it had signaled the restoration of peace and happiness, but all is not well from within the universe.

Rumors have been circulating about the unexpected return of Bilstein in a new cybernetic body, as well as the appearance of a ghost who eerily looks like Bilstein's old cybernetic body. At the same time, the Fourth Empire has taken the opportunity in rebuilding its strong forces and that the loyal members of the organization are quite determined to carry out Bilstein's evil will of eliminating those who stand in the way of their emperor's universal conquest.

Hayato, June, Saturn, and Gamof soon realize that the malevolent threat of Bilstein is far from over and that the four of them must head back into the relentless fight in order to defeat Bilstein and the Fourth Empire once and for all. However, the quartet is not alone from within their second battle as they have new friends to assist them from within the inevitable conflict, such as their former enemy turned ally Zelkin, an extremely strong Japanese military war soldier named Gantetsu, a noble and aspiring young American modern-day superhero with a bird motif named Eagle, and a mysterious yet cheerful young Japanese rhythmic gymnast named Ele. Hayato and his friends will find themselves heading back into the hard ordeal as Star Gladiators, Fourth Empire members, and neutral parties will be thrust into a war that will determine the fate of not only the Earth, but the entire universe.

The Nightmare of Bilstein has now begun.

Characters
Hayato Kanzaki:
The main protagonist of the series. A rebellious young Japanese intergalactic bounty hunter who fights with a Plasma Sword. Hayato had defeated Bilstein from within the events of the Final Crusade and had settled down with June, spending his days peacefully in rebuilding the orphanage with the bounties that he had earned. During the events from the first battle against the Fourth Empire, Hayato had also befriended Gamof, Gantetsu, Zelkin, and Saturn. One day after coming back home from another successful bounty hunting mission, Hayato is shocked to hear and learn that June had suddenly disappeared with his friends telling him on what had happened. Hayato sets out to find June and to finish things with Bilstein once and for all.

Black Hayato:
In his last fight against Hayato, Bilstein had managed to implant a "genotype" microchip in the protagonist. It eventually took control of Hayato, and the microchip transformed him into Black Hayato: a cruel and ruthless swordsman who has a cold and emotionless fighting personality, the opposite of the original Hayato's own personality, and fights with a Plasma Sword. While Black Hayato is evil, he still hates Bilstein for what he did, and he'll attack and eliminate anyone and anything who gets in his way. If the player beats the game with Black Hayato, he'll try to kill June on sight, but the small bit of consciousness that Hayato has left will attempt to stop him. Should Black Hayato win, the effects of the microchip will remain permanent, and the real Hayato will be gone forever. In Gantetsu's ending, Black Hayato is shown as a separate entity from the original Hayato when he is actually in the latter's body.

June Lin Milliam:
A talented young British-Chinese rhythmic gymnast of mixed descent who fights with a Plasma Ring. June had settled down with Hayato after the events of the first game and began to develop personal feelings for him. When June had heard of Bilstein's unexpected return, she painfully left Hayato to avenge her parents' death and to prevent the monster from hurting anyone else that she has cared for and about. Hayato eventually catches up to June and shields her from a blow from Bilstein's ghost, angering June to defeat the fiend for good.

Ele:
A mysterious yet cheerful young Japanese rhythmic gymnast who fights with a Plasma Ring and that she had traveled back into the current past from a distant future through the use of a time machine. In Ele's time, she was taught how to fight by her mother and is able to use many acrobatic skills and techniques from within her fighting expertise. Bilstein's ghost, which was obsessed with its never-ending hunt for Hayato, had attacked Ele's home one day from within a shocking yet terrifying sight. The status of Ele's father is unknown, but her mother had died during the incident. As Ele has a time limit of how long she can stay in the past, she immediately hurries to find and vanquish Bilstein's ghost as soon as possible so that she can prevent the tragic event from ever happening. Ele is highly implied to be Hayato and June's daughter. Ele makes a cameo appearance in one of Hayato's victory poses in Marvel vs. Capcom 2 and in Felicia's ending in Capcom Fighting Evolution.

Saturn Dyer:
A green-skinned cone-headed alien who is named after the planet where he comes from in the Andromeda Galaxy of the universe (but not the one present in Earth's Solar System) and that he fights with Plasma Yo-Yos while having quite an eccentric yet friendly personality towards those who meet him. Saturn is a well-known and renowned popular street performer from within his home planet who is quite the comic relief joker. Upon hearing and learning of his home planet's downfall to the Fourth Empire, Saturn goes along with his friends to defeat Bilstein and to save his people and family.

Prince:
The name "Prince" is an alias for Saturn Kuida-Ore the 3rd, who happens to be the royal prince of the Planet Saturn who fights with Plasma Yo-Yos. Prince grew jealous of Saturn as he got more attention from the citizens of their home planet and from within due time, he had developed a strong determination to defeat Saturn and prove that he's a much better street performer. After adopting the alias of "Prince", he allies himself with Bilstein and uses the Fourth Empire's influence as a front for chasing his own rival.

Gamof Gohgry:
A brown-furred alien who comes from the forest planet of De Rosa which lies from within the Andromeda Galaxy of the universe and that he fights with a Plasma Axe. While Gamof, who is a noble lumberjack assists Hayato and the others from within their battle against Bilstein and the Fourth Empire, he is challenged by an evil contender (who is playable as a palette swap) who works for the Fourth Empire. Gamof fights to ensure his home planet's safety and to help his friends out in battling against Bilstein and the Fourth Empire. June visits Gamof and De Rosa many years later with her young daughter Ele, saying that Earth has no real nature left and that she had wanted to show her daughter the rich nature of De Rosa.

Gantetsu:
An extremely strong Japanese military war soldier and heavy drinker who fights with a Plasma Axe. Even though Gantetsu lacks strategic thinking, he makes up for it with his tough stamina and relentless endurance of pure combat. Under orders from his superiors in the Earth Federation, Gantetsu is given the mission of tracking down Franco Gerelt for his war crimes against humanity. Upon managing to capture Gerelt and learning of his tragic story, Gantetsu quickly forgives him and takes him to a bar for a victory drink.

Franco Gerelt:
A renowned and honorable Spanish matador who is an expert fencer and that he fights with a Plasma Rapier while valuing honor from within the fights that he participates in. During the events of the Final Crusade, Gerelt was captured by Bilstein and had a bomb implanted in his chest, forcing him to join the Fourth Empire in the hopes of not only disarming the bomb and defeating Bilstein, but also to rescue his wife and daughter, who were kidnapped by the villain in order to blackmail Gerelt into becoming his reluctant ally. Gerelt had committed heinous crimes against humanity from within a reluctant and regretful manner, and even when Bilstein was defeated by the forces of good, Gerelt had hesitated to return to his family, who were rescued safely by the Earth Federation forces. However, Claire's sacrifice, as well as his wife and daughter's love, convinced Gerelt that everyone can be forgiven in the end, and so Gerelt was able to move on in his life with his family, putting his hard ordeal behind him.

Claire:
A Spanish female fencer who fights with a Plasma Rapier and that she happens to be a long-time friend of Gerelt, in which she works with him under Bilstein. It is unclear of why Claire had joined the Fourth Empire, but it is speculated that something tragic had happened to her in the past and that she saw the Fourth Empire as a way of escaping her own inner pain and suffering. In battle, Claire is known as Scarlet Del Sol and is a master at fencing, using her precise fencing skills to mercilessly defeat her opponents. Unlike Gerelt, Claire is very loyal to Bilstein and holds the button to the bomb planted inside Gerelt's chest. Upon hearing and learning about Gerelt's revolt against Bilstein, Claire confronts him and demands an explanation from Gerelt, leading to an impromptu battle between the two fencers. Before Claire can make her final move against Gerelt, Luca confronts them unexpectedly, under orders from Gore to eliminate Claire. When Luca explodes from a Plasma energy overload due to the intensity of the match, Claire shields Gerelt from the blast and dies in his arms. It is heavily implied from within Claire's last words that she may have developed feelings for Gerelt during their time together in the Fourth Empire, and that she had wanted to spend the rest of her life with him.

Vector:
An emotionless prototype assassin robot created by Bilstein to become the ultimate killing weapon that fights with a Plasma Gun. Bilstein implants a program to make Vector self-evolutionary and unleashes it to test its potential abilities against his enemies. Should Vector prove successful in its mission, Bilstein will then unleash an army of Vectors to destroy anyone and anything against him.

Omega:
An older prototype of the current Vector model that fights with a Plasma Gun. He had previously been discarded and buried in a pile of junk before being reactivated by a hit from lightning. Omega was long deemed faulty by its creator for being too compassionate. After hearing that it has a "heart", Omega searches to know on what it is before its current energy supply runs out. After failing to gain answers from Bilstein, Omega soon encounters Ele, who thinks that it is another killer Vector. Ele soon realizes Omega's true nature and explains to it that the "heart" the robot wants is something that is felt. As soon as Omega figures out on what Ele says by that specific statement, its energy runs out. Many years later, Omega is found by a pack of kids, one of them pointing out that the robot is smiling.

Zelkin Fiskekrogen:
A blue-feathered bird-like humanoid alien who comes from the Planet Klondike which lies from within the Andromeda Galaxy of the universe and that he fights with a Plasma Claw. Zelkin's race are brave and noble valiant warriors who treasure honor and power found in true battle. Zelkin's former alliance with Bilstein was formed because of his personal hatred for humans, due to their past prejudice against his people. However, after fighting Hayato from within the events of the Final Crusade, Zelkin soon found out and realized that Earthlings had honor as well. Feeling responsible for the tragedy he had caused, Zelkin had defected from the Fourth Empire  and was obligated by honor to "repay the debt" to Hayato and his friends. If Zelkin fights and wins against Hayato, he will give him one of his head feathers as a sign of respect.

Eagle:
A noble and aspiring young American modern-day superhero with a bird motif who fights with a Plasma Blade. Eagle was once an ordinary man who used to work as a faux superhero at Gorakuem Amusement Park  with a bird-like costume and a pair of artificial wings. The tyranny that Bilstein had caused throughout most of the universe had motivated Eagle to become a real-life hero of justice, expressing it in a typical superhero fashion. It is suggested that Eagle is Capcom's in-joke character as he'll claim that he is the real Zelkin, harking back to past hero films where animal characters were actors in a suit.

Gore Gajah:
A big-brained pointy-eared tanned alien-esque Indonesian who fights with a Plasma Mace. In his never-ending research for Plasma Power, Gore, who is a genius magician had joined Bilstein's Fourth Empire as Bilstein had a large library of forbidden Plasma info. However, Gore had planned to secretly betray Bilstein and take everything for himself. Gore's plans however go awry when Bilstein commands him to retire the artificial girl he made, Luca due to the fact that Bilstein had feared about the possible security threat that Luca had posed to him and the Fourth Empire. Gore had rebelled against Bilstein's command and went into immediate hiding with Luca. To avoid easy detection, Gore had changed his appearance with Plasma Magic and went into leisurely seclusion, possibly marrying Luca as well.

Luca:
An artificial alien-esque girl made by Gore who fights with a Plasma Mace. Luca is Gore's fiancée/assistant  and is only dedicated to him. Even though Luca has a kind and cheerful personality, she also has unusual sadistic tendencies and is naive to the concept of pain and death, killing other people as if it was a game. Omega will not recognize Luca as "human", sending her into denial about her own existence. If Bilstein tells Luca that she isn't human, Luca's own mind will reach its breaking point and she will unintentionally murder Gore.

Blood Barbarians:
A robust young American expert swordsman who fights with a Plasma Broadsword and had previously worked under Bilstein as a brainwashed servant. The brainwashing that Bilstein had cast on Blood wears off and that Blood is able to regain his freewill. Much to Blood's dismay however, the damage has been done and is irreversible; Blood's robotic left arm is dependent on Bilstein's existence and that he has killed far too many innocent people. Sickened by the brainwashing microchip that had controlled him, Blood heads to the emperor's side in a mission of eliminating Bilstein once and for all. Blood walks on a path of mortal redemption, intending to kill Bilstein and himself for the sins that were committed in the name of the Fourth Empire. If Blood is the one to defeat Bilstein, the Fourth Empire flying fortress will begin to collapse and that Blood will sacrifice himself to reduce and lessen the reactor's explosion in order to save the Earth and its people.

Shaker:
One of the many Shaker clones of Blood who strangely shares his progenitor's levitating robotic left arm and Plasma Broadsword. The group of Shaker clones bicker over the identity of the original Shaker and a specific one sets out to prove on who's the original. All Shakers love punk music and especially love guitars.

Dr. Edward Bilstein:
The main antagonist of the series. A Nobel Prize-winning German-American prestigious physicist and cybernetic mad scientist emperor who fights with a Plasma Broadsword and leads the Fourth Empire in his universal conquest. Bilstein was killed in the Final Crusade by Hayato, but was able to transcend his spirit into a new cybernetic body so that he can live again. After rebuilding his forces and conquering other planets, Bilstein once again resume his plans for complete domination of the universe. Bilstein particularly focuses his efforts on Earth, the planet that evaded him the first time.

Ghost Bilstein:
Bilstein's old cybernetic body that was discarded after Bilstein himself was able to transcend his spirit into his new cybernetic body. For an unknown reason, Ghost Bilstein had gained a small bit of Bilstein's own consciousness, and because of that, it was able to live once more without its previous host. Ghost Bilstein is an unthinking entity who fights with a Plasma Broadsword and is purely obsessed with slaying Hayato, eliminating anyone and anything who gets in its way. If Ghost Bilstein defeats Hayato, it will deem Hayato as too weak and will continue on its relentless rampage, destroying anything in its path to find the "real" Hayato.

Rain:
Bilstein's beautiful and ambitious German-American daughter who fights with a Plasma Scythe. Rain was sent by her father to capture all of the male Plasma masters and imprison them at Bilstein's lair. Later, Rain's father had planned to use their DNA, Hayato in particular, and impregnate his own daughter, making her the mother of "New Human Beings": people who would hypothetically have unstoppable Plasma power to the point of easy universal domination. If Rain succeeds in her mission of defeating and subduing Hayato, she will find her father's plan boring and after beating her own father, Rain will nominate herself as queen of the universe with the men as her slaves.

Kaede:
A young sly Japanese kunoichi who fights with a Plasma Hammer. Kaede was hired by the Earth Federation to seal off the Plasma power of all the other Plasma fighters. When Kaede's benefactors turn on her, she immediately escapes from their base with ease, but not before she steals all the money from their safe so that Kaede can spend the rest of her days in a state of complete luxury. Kaede is the first sub-boss and secret character who can be played through the use of a code.

Byakko:
A mysterious white-furred tiger-like humanoid alien who fights with Plasma Claws. Byakko is a skilled ninja and a member of The Four Saint Beasts (based on the Chinese constellations) which was created by the Union to foil Bilstein's plans. Byakko's mission is to destroy the source of the Plasma weapons and any wielder he meets. Byakko is also suspected by Gantetsu to be the one who had decimated his troop from within a past incident. Byakko's win quotes suggest that he has a Zen-like nature. If Byakko succeeds in his mission of defeating Bilstein, the Union will order Rai-on to execute him as he has become "too powerful" and a possible threat. Byakko escapes, saying he has much to live for and that he can't die just yet.

Rai-On:
A mysterious black-furred lion-like humanoid alien who fights with Plasma Claws and that he happens to be another member of The Four Saint Beasts who has the same mission as Byakko. Rai-on is more vicious by nature and is a wrathful ninja. Rai-on is essentially a color swap of Byakko with black fur, instead of white, with red eyes. Rai-on's ending is similar to Byakko's, with him defeating Bilstein first and that Rai-on is then forced to battle against Byakko. Even though Byakko manages to escape, Rai-on sends the other Saint Beasts to hunt the wounded Byakko down and that he'll anticipate another bout between himself and his former teammate. Rai-on is the second sub-boss and secret character who can be played through the use of a code.

Reception

The Dreamcast version received mixed reviews according to the review aggregation website GameRankings. An unnamed reviewer of Next Generation said of the arcade version in its September 1998 issue, "Capcom has taken few (if any) big steps forward with Plasma Sword, but the fighting game giant has managed to round out and deepen the gameplay essentials of its growing 3D library." 18 issues later, however, Jeff Lundrigan of the same magazine (now labeled NextGen) said of the former version in his early review on its March 2000 issue, "If you're working your way down the list of Dreamcast brawlers, this is the one to buy next to last (just ahead of Mortal Kombat Gold)." In Japan, Famitsu gave the same console version a score of 31 out of 40.

Also in Japan, Game Machine listed the arcade version on their June 1, 1998 issue as being the third most-successful arcade game of the month.

See also
 Project X Zone 2

References
Unless otherwise specified, all sources are cited from the 1999 Dreamcast port using official English translations.

External links
 Official Japanese website (Includes character biographies)
 
 

1998 video games
3D fighting games
Arcade video games
Capcom games
Dreamcast games
Fighting games
Science fiction video games
Video game sequels
Video games developed in Japan
Video games scored by Tetsuya Shibata
Virgin Interactive games

ja:スターグラディエイター